Queen Victoria Street is the main road entering the city centre of Fremantle, Western Australia from the direction of Perth.
The road was originally named Cantonment Road, but was subsequently renamed Victoria Road, and a few years later Queen Victoria Street, after Queen Victoria of the United Kingdom, to avoid confusion with similarly named roads in the area.

Due to its proximity to Fremantle Harbour it has at times had very heavy traffic.

Route description

After another , the road reaches the Fremantle Traffic Bridge which crosses the Swan River. On the south side of the river, the road meets Canning Highway, and turns south-west towards the centre of Fremantle. The remaining  of Queen Victoria Street does not have a route allocation, and the road ends at its intersection with Parry Street. Adelaide Street continues south-west from that intersection, to High Street.

Crossing the Swan River

In the 1830s ferries operated on the Swan River, including from North Fremantle and from Preston Point, further up the river. The North Fremantle ferry only transported people and luggage, whilst the Preston Point ferry also transported livestock.

There also existed a capstan, but only the base remains, which is known as the Ferry Capstan Base. There is no clear evidence of the construction date or usage, however there are accounts of it pulling a dredger and barges up the river, via a rope connected to a winch in the capstan. The accounts vary as to how it was powered, either by convicts or animals pushing an iron bar to rotate the capstan, which was centred on a vertical axle.

There have been four different bridges at this location since the 1860s, the first of which was a timber bridge was constructed between 1863 and 1867, using convict labour. The second bridge was constructed between 1896 and 1898 downstream of the existing bridge. Whilst wider and stronger, it was only intended to be a temporary structure while the old bridge was removed and replaced. However, no construction or demolition works occurred until 10 years later, with the old bridge left for pedestrians. The third bridge was a renovation of the original bridge, which had its deck replaced, new support piles added, and existing piles modified. The previous bridge was demolished after this bridge, which also catered for trams, was opened in 1909.
The current structure, which opened on 15 December 1939, was also only intended to be used for a few years, but has remained in service since then, with major strengthening and repair works carried out in 1978 and 1982.

Street features

The street was the main street of the former Town of North Fremantle (1895–1961).  The North Fremantle war memorial and the former North Fremantle Town Hall are located on the street.

Two bars are also located on the north side of the river along Queen Victoria Street: Mojo's Bar and the Swan Hotel, which has been on the street for over 100 years.

In 2011, Queen Victoria Street underwent road works to improve traffic accommodation and the amenity of the area.

Major intersections

  Stirling Highway (State Route 5) – to Perth
 Tydeman Road – to Sunset Coast Tourist Drive 204
  Canning Highway (State Route 6) – to East Fremantle, Bicton and Applecross
 Beach Street – to Fremantle railway station
  James Street (State Route 12 south-east) – via Ord Street and Hampton Road to South Fremantle, Hamilton Hill and Spearwood
 Parry Street (north-west and south-east) / Adelaide Street (south-west) – to Fremantle city centre

References

Route description

 
 

Streets in Fremantle
Articles containing video clips